Ceri Sherlock (born August 1954) is a Welsh theatre, film and television director.

Ceri Sherlock was educated at Ysgol Dewi Sant, Llandovery College, King's College, London, the University of Glamorgan and as a Fulbright Scholar at the University of California, Los Angeles.  
He was a Judith E Wilson Visiting Fellow at the University of Cambridge and a Niipkow Fellow, Berlin. He was a trainee director and director with Theatr Cymru and Welsh National Opera and held posts as Artistic Director of Actors' Touring Company and Theatrig.

In 1993 Sherlock directed Dafydd for BBC 2.  In 1995, his Welsh-language film Branwen won the Best Film award at the Celtic Film Festival. His feature Cameleon won a Golden Spire and a Golden Gate at the San Francisco Film Festival 1999.

He was first Expert Advisor in Culture and Arts for the National Assembly of Wales 2000–2002.

Sherlock was a Commissioning Editor at S4C before joining the BBC as Commissioning Executive Arts (BBC Wales) and an Executive Producer (BBC4) in 2006. He is an Honorary Professor in Drama at Kingston University and  the University of Aberystwyth. He re-located in 2010 to Hong Kong, where he became a Professor and Dean of Drama at the Hong Kong Academy for Performing Arts. In 2016, after being cleared of an accusation of sexual harassment, he resigned from his position.

References

1954 births
Living people
Alumni of King's College London
Welsh film directors